The Energa anti-tank rifle grenade is a rifle-launched anti-tank grenade that is propelled by a ballistite-filled blank cartridge. The name Energa comes from the firm in Liechtenstein that designed it, the Anstalt für die ENtwicklung von ERfindungen und Gewerblichen Anwendungen, based in Vaduz.

First produced in the 1950s, by Mecar in Belgium, it was in front-line use by European armies until replaced by disposable tube-launched anti-tank rockets such as the M72 LAW. Although no longer in production, stocks of the grenade still exist and the Energa grenade remains in service with Third World countries. Armscor of South Africa manufactured the R1M1, an improved version of the Energa grenade.

The original Energa grenade could penetrate 200 mm (7.8 inches) of armor or 500 mm (19.6 inches) of concrete at an angle of impact of 90 degrees.  At an angle of impact of 45 degrees, the figures dropped to 100 mm (3.9 inches) and 250 mm (9.8 inches), respectively.

The Super Energa used a rocket booster to extend the grenade's range to 550 meters. The Super Energa could penetrate up to 275 mm (10.8 inches) of armor and 600 mm (23.6 inches) of concrete.

U.S. service
Early in the Korean War, U.S. forces found their World War II-era anti-tank rifle grenades were ineffective against the frontal armor of T-34 tanks.  This led the U.S. to produce their own version of the Energa, the M28 rifle grenade, from 1950 until 1960. Originally the M28 was fired from Mecar's proprietary  T119 (M1 Garand) and T120 (M1 Carbine) launchers. The T119 was soon replaced by the improved M7A3 launcher (M1 Garand) from September 1952 onwards. The M28 was eventually replaced in US military service by the M31 HEAT rifle grenade and later by the M72 LAW rocket. The M29 TP (Training Practice) round remained in service until it was replaced in 1961 by the improved M31 TP.

UK service

In British service, the Energa was known as the Anti-Tank Grenade, No. 94 (ENERGA). It was designed to be fired from the Projector (No. 4 Rifle) Mark 5 (c.1952), an attachment for the Lee–Enfield No.4 Rifle. The later L1A1 Self-Loading Rifle could also fire the Energa, but it was not commonly done. It was made obsolete by the adoption of the 84mm L14A1 Medium Anti-tank Weapon (MAW) and the 66mm M72 Light Anti-tank Weapon (LAW).

The Energa was introduced to infantry units of the British Army of the Rhine from 1952 when it replaced the PIAT. It was issued one per person within the infantry platoon and attached to the waist belt and fired from Projector Mark 5 attached to the Lee–Enfield No. 4 Rifle and later fired from a similar projector attached to the muzzle of the L1A1 Self-loading Rifle.

South African service
The South African 75mm R1M1 version was used during the South African involvement in Angola during the 1970s and 1980s. It was launched from standard R1 (FN-FAL) rifles.

Bangladeshi service
Bangladeshi mukti bahini members used ENERGA grenades in a large number.

Netherlands service
Netherlands produced three versions of Energa,  the NR4 was a live grenade, the NR5 was an inert practice grenade, and the NR18 was a practice grenade with white chalk in a plastic nosecone that shattered on impact and left a strike mark on the target.

Belgian service
Energa saw service with the ABL. It could be fired from both the FN-FAL and also from the FN Model 1949 (SAFN). The Belgians also produced an inert training grenade. AT GR PRAC 75 mm.

Performance of variants

References

Further reading 
Ian Hogg. Jane's Infantry Weapons 1984-85, London: Jane's Publishing Company Ltd., 1984.

External links
 Energa photos and information

Anti-tank grenades
Infantry weapons of the Cold War
Rifle grenades
Grenades of Belgium
Mecar